A Virtuous Vamp is a 1919 American silent comedy film produced by and starring Constance Talmadge that was directed by David Kirkland and Sidney Franklin. It was written by Anita Loos and John Emerson based on the 1909 play The Bachelor by Clyde Fitch.

On December 18, 2013, the Library of Congress announced that this film had been selected for the National Film Registry for being "culturally, historically, or aesthetically significant".

Cast

See also
National Film Preservation Foundation

References

External links

A Virtuous Vamp essay by Jennifer Ann Redmond at National Film Registry

Progressive Silent Film List: A Virtuous Vamp at silentera.com

1919 films
1919 comedy films
American silent feature films
Silent American comedy films
United States National Film Registry films
First National Pictures films
American films based on plays
Films directed by Sidney Franklin
American black-and-white films
1910s American films